Laura Giombini (born  4 January 1989) is an Italian beach volleyball player. She represented her country at the 2016 Summer Olympics in Rio de Janeiro.

Three days before the opening ceremony the Italian Volleyball Federation partnered Laura with Marta Menegatti.

References

External links
 
 
 

1989 births
Living people
Italian beach volleyball players
Beach volleyball players at the 2016 Summer Olympics
Olympic beach volleyball players of Italy
Beach volleyball players at the 2015 European Games
European Games competitors for Italy
21st-century Italian women